Warahirka or Wara Hirka (Quechua, wara trousers / bee, Ancash Quechua hirka mountain, Hispanicized spellings Huarajirca, Huara Jirca) is a mountain with an archaeological site of the same name in Peru. It is situated in the Huánuco Region, Yarowilca Province, Pampamarca District, about 1.5 km from Pampamarca, near La Florida and Warahirka (Huarajirca).

References 

Mountains of Peru
Mountains of Huánuco Region
Archaeological sites in Huánuco Region
Archaeological sites in Peru